Yu-5 or Yu 5 may refer to:

Yu-5 torpedo, a Chinese torpedo
, an Imperial Japanese Army transport submarine of World War II